Bitolski Vesnik (Macedonian Cyrillic: Битолски Весник) is a regional weekly newspaper in North Macedonia. First the newspaper had only 8 pages. Since 1998 the newspaper organizes a manifestation "We select the most successful people from Bitola".

External links
45th Anniversary 30.04.2009

References

Macedonian-language mass media
Macedonian-language newspapers
Newspapers published in North Macedonia
Newspapers published in Yugoslavia